Carl Ford, III (born October 8, 1980 in Monroe, Michigan) is an American football wide receiver.  He was originally drafted in the seventh round of the 2003 NFL Draft by the Green Bay Packers of the National Football League out of the University of Toledo.  Ford has also played for the Philadelphia Eagles, Chicago Bears and the Detroit Lions.

On May 22, 2007, he was released by the Chicago Rush of the Arena Football League.

High school years
Ford attended Monroe High School in Monroe, Michigan and was a letterman in football, basketball, and track. He graduated in 1999.

College years
Ford attended the University of Toledo on a football scholarship. From 1999-2002 at Toledo, he caught 134 passes for 1,794 yards and 15 touchdowns.

External links
 Roster Information

1980 births
Living people
People from Monroe, Michigan
American football wide receivers
Toledo Rockets football players
Chicago Bears players
Philadelphia Eagles players
Chicago Rush players